Nana, the True Key of Pleasure is a 1982 English-language Italian drama film directed by Dan Wolman based on Émile Zola's 1880 novel Nana. The music is by Ennio Morricone. The film was produced by Yoram Globus and Menahem Golan.

Plot
Winsome Nana performs as an attraction in the magic show of Mellies the magician at the Minotaure, including in erotic shadow play and "moving photographs". She afterwards puts in work as a prostitute. Zoe acts as her confidante and chambermaid. Many rich and influential men are besotted by Nana's youthful beauty and want to make her their own. The banker Steiner buys her a house, but she soon throws him out and uses it to pursue her business.

At one point, Nana hosts an erotic hunt for her guests, who can watch through looking glasses a real-life pornographic show unfold itself before their eyes. She also engages in a lesbian encounter with Satin, one of the female customers at the Minotaure. Count Muffat as well as his son Hector are equally besotted by Nana. When she is introduced to the prizefighter Bijou, she gets Muffat to sponsor him; Bijou is killed in a fight to the death, the count is ruined, and eventually, he and his family are evicted from their residence by Steiner the banker who has rigged the fight.

When Muffat complains to Nana about his ruin, she reveals to him that his wife has been cheating on him with Faucherie, an intrigue which she has previously arranged, and the men fight each other in a duel. Nana then ruins the wedding of young Hector Muffat when she elopes with him in a horse-drawn carriage. Eventually, however, there is honour among thieves: Muffat becomes minister of the interior, sponsored by Faucherie, and Nana leaves in a hot air balloon for India to meditate - taking yet another beau along for the ride.

Cast
 Katya Berger: Nana
 Shirin Taylor: Zoe, Nana's maid
 Jean-Pierre Aumont: comte de Muffat (count Muffat)
 Mandy Rice-Davies: Sabine, comtesse de Muffat
 Marcus Beresford: Hector Muffat
 Yehuda Efroni: Steiner, the banker
 Massimo Serato: Faucherie, journalist for Le Figaro
 Annie Belle: Rennée de Chéselles, fiancée of Hector
 Debra Berger: Satin
 Tom Felleghy: Mellies the magician

References

External links
 
 
 

1982 films
1982 drama films
1982 LGBT-related films
Adultery in films
Italian drama films
Films scored by Ennio Morricone
Films based on works by Émile Zola
Films based on French novels
Golan-Globus films
English-language Italian films
Cockfighting in film
Films produced by Menahem Golan
Films about prostitution
Lesbian-related films
Films produced by Yoram Globus
1980s Italian films